Baba Monir (also Romanized as Bābā Monīr; also known as Bābā Monir and Baba Munir) is a city in Mahur Rural District, Mahvarmilani District, Mamasani County, Fars Province, Iran. At the 2006 census, its population was 1,501, in 351 families.

Baba Monir became the centre of Mahvarmilani District in 1961. Baba Monir was declared a city by the Iranian Interior Ministry directive regarding Fars Province in 2012.

References 

Populated places in Mamasani County
Cities in Fars Province